is a Japanese manga artist and singer-songwriter. He is married to singer Reina Hayashi—a member of Mimizuguzu—and lives in Nakano, Tokyo.

He won the 2016 Kodansha Manga Award for his manga Kōnodori.

References

1973 births
Manga artists from Yamanashi Prefecture
Japanese male singer-songwriters
Japanese singer-songwriters
Musicians from Yamanashi Prefecture
Writers from Yamanashi Prefecture
Living people
21st-century Japanese singers
21st-century Japanese male singers